The 2011 CAF Champions League (also known as the 2011 Orange CAF Champions League for sponsorship reasons) was the 47th edition of Africa's premier club football tournament organized by the Confederation of African Football (CAF), and the 15th edition under the current CAF Champions League format. The winner Espérance ST participated in the 2011 FIFA Club World Cup, and also played in the 2012 CAF Super Cup.

Association team allocation 
Theoretically, up to 55 CAF member associations may enter the 2011 CAF Champions League, with the 12 highest ranked associations according to CAF 5-Year Ranking eligible to enter 2 teams in the competition. For this year's competition, CAF used . As a result, a maximum of 67 teams could enter the tournament – although this level has never been reached.

Ranking system

CAF calculates points for each entrant association based on their clubs’ performance over the last 5 years in the CAF Champions League and CAF Confederation Cup, not taking into considering the running year. The criteria for points are the following:

The points are multiplied by a coefficient according to the year as follow:
2009 – 5
2008 – 4
2007 – 3
2006 – 2
2005 – 1

This system is different from the one used for the 2010 CAF Champions League and previous years.

A similar procedure is used to rank clubs, with the exception that the results from 2006–2010 are used (with 2010 weighted by 5, 2009 by 4, and so on)

Entrants list 
Below is the entrants list for the competition. Nations are shown according to their 2005–2009 CAF 5-Year Ranking – those with a ranking score have their rank and score indicated. Teams were also seeded using their individual team 2006–2010 5-Year Ranking. The top nine sides (shown in bold) received byes to the first qualifying round.

Notes
Associations that did not enter a team: Cape Verde, Djibouti, Eritrea, Guinea-Bissau, Malawi, Mauritius, Namibia, Réunion, São Tomé and Príncipe, Somalia, Togo, Uganda
Unranked associations have no ranking points and hence are equal 20th.
Unranked teams have no rankings points and hence are equal 21st.  Club ranking is determined only between teams qualified for the 2011 CAF Champions League.

Round and draw dates 
Schedule of dates for 2011 competition.

† The second leg of the preliminary round matches are postponed to 25–27 February (or further to 4–6 March) in case the club have at least three players in the 2011 African Nations Championship.

Qualifying rounds 

The fixtures for the preliminary, first and second qualifying rounds were announced on 20 December 2010.

Qualification ties were decided over two legs, with aggregate goals used to determine the winner. If the sides were level on aggregate after the second leg, the away goals rule applied, and if still level, the tie proceeded directly to a penalty shootout (no extra time is played).

Preliminary round

|}

Notes
Note 1: Inter Luanda advanced to the first round after Township Rollers F.C. withdrew.
Note 2: Raja Casablanca advanced to the first round after Tourbillon withdrew following the first leg.

First round

|}
Notes
Note 3: Al-Ittihad advanced to the second round after JC Abidjan withdrew. Tie was scheduled to be played at a neutral venue over one leg due to the political situations in Côte d'Ivoire and Libya, but match did not take place.
Note 4: Tie played over one leg due to the political situation in Côte d'Ivoire.
Note 5: Second leg abandoned on 90+5 minutes with Zamalek SC leading 2–1 (Club Africain leading 5–4 on aggregate) when Zamalek SC fans invaded the pitch.
Note 6: TP Mazembe won 6–3 on aggregate, but were later disqualified for fielding an ineligible player. As a result, Simba played against Moroccan side Wydad AC, which lost to TP Mazembe in the second round, in a play-off for a place in the group stage.

Second round

|}

Notes
Note 7: Ties scheduled to be played over one leg due to the political situations in Côte d'Ivoire and Libya.
Note 8: Second leg abandoned on 81 minutes with the score at 1–1 (Al-Hilal leading 2–1 on aggregate) when Club Africain fans invaded the pitch.
Note 9: TP Mazembe won 2–1 on aggregate, but were later disqualified for fielding an ineligible player in the first round. As a result, Wydad AC played against Tanzanian side Simba, which lost to TP Mazembe in the first round, in a play-off for a place in the group stage.

The losing teams from the second round advance to the 2011 CAF Confederation Cup play-off round.

Special play-off 
On 14 May 2011, CAF announced that TP Mazembe (Congo DR) were ejected from the Champions League following a complaint about the eligibility of TP Mazembe player Janvier Besala Bokungu from Tanzanian club Simba, who lost to them in the first round. 

As a result, the Organising Committee decided that a replacement for the group stage would be determined by a play-off match at a neutral venue between Simba and Moroccan club Wydad AC (who lost to TP Mazembe in the second round).

|}

Group stage

Group A

Group B

Knock-out stage

Bracket

Semifinals

|}

Final

Espérance de Tunis won 1–0 on aggregate.

Top scorers

See also
 2011 CAF Confederation Cup
 2012 CAF Super Cup

References

External links
CAF Champions League

 
2011
1